Obed Mutanya (born 10 August 1981 in Chingola) is a Zambian long-distance and cross country runner. He was a two-time All-American in outdoor track for the University of Arizona and competed in cross-country and indoor track for the Wildcats as well. He placed in the 5000 meters finals at two consecutive NCAA DI Outdoor T&F Championships in 2006 and 2007.

Running career
As a junior, he competed internationally in the 5000 metres, finishing thirteenth at the 1998 World Junior Championships and fourth at the 2000 World Junior Championships. He competed in the long race at the World Cross Country Championships in 2000, 2001, 2002 and 2004. His best place was 23rd in 2001.

References

External links

1981 births
Living people
People from Chingola
Zambian male long-distance runners
Commonwealth Games competitors for Zambia
Athletes (track and field) at the 2002 Commonwealth Games